Kanevsky or Kanevskoy (masculine), Kanevskaya (feminine), or Kanevskoye (neuter) may refer to:

People 
Viktor Kanevskyi (1936–2018), Soviet soccer player
Victor Kanevsky (dancer) (born 1963), American ballroom dancer, dance sport coach
Giselle Kañevsky (born 1985), Argentinian field hockey player
Leonid Kanevsky (born 1939), Russian/Israeli actor
Alex Kanevsky (born 1963), painter currently based in Philadelphia, Pennsylvania
Meyer Kanewsky (c. 1880-1924), Russian-American Hazzan and recording artist
Vitali Kanevsky (born 1935), Soviet film director and screenwriter

Other 
Kanevskoy District, a district in Krasnodar Krai, Russia
Kanevskaya, a rural locality (a stanitsa) in Krasnodar Krai, Russia
Kanevskaya TV Mast, among the tallest structures

See also
Kanievsky (disambiguation)
Kaniv, a city in central Ukraine